Bogdan Zakrzewski (25 September 1916 in Poznań – 23 October 2011 in Wrocław) was a Polish historian and researcher of Polish literature. He was a professor of the University of Wrocław (since 1958), editor-in-chief of Pamiętnik Literacki (1960–1998), member of the Polish Academy of Learning (since 1992).

Zakrzewski was a researcher of Polish literature of Romanticism, patriotic and revolutionary songs of 19th century, literature and folklore of Silesia.

Notable works
 Mickiewicz w Wielkopolsce (1949)
 Tematy śląskie (1973)
 Fredro i Fredrusie (1974)
 Fredro z paradyzu (1976)
 Palen na cara (1979)
 Sztandar i krew (1982)
 Hajże na Soplicę (1990)
 Fredro nie tylko komediopisarz (1993)
 Dwaj wieszcze, Mickiewicz i Wernyhora (1996)
 "Natust est" Pan Tadeusz (2001)

References

Further references

 Zmarł badacz romantyzmu prof. Bogdan Zakrzewski 

1916 births
2011 deaths
Polish literary historians
Writers from Poznań
20th-century Polish historians
Polish male non-fiction writers
Academic staff of the University of Wrocław